Sadowa may refer to:

Places

 Sadowa, German name for the town of Sadová in the Czech Republic
 Sadowa, Łódź Voivodeship, a village in central Poland
 Sadowa, Masovian Voivodeship, a village in east-central Poland
 Sadowa, Ontario, a town in the municipality of Kawartha Lakes, Ontario, Canada
 Sadowa Wisznia, Polish name for a small city once part of eastern Poland, now in Ukraine

People 
  (born 1985), Polish actress

Historic events

 Battle of Sadowa (also Battle of Königgrätz), the decisive 1866 battle of the Austro-Prussian War